The XVII Waffen Corps of the SS (Hungarian) (German XVII. Waffen-Armeekorps der SS) was a Waffen-SS corps during World War II. The formation of the corps was announced in March 1945 and was supposed to consist of Hungarians and Hungarian Volksdeutsche, but was never fully formed as an independent unit.

History
The corps headquarters was established in March 1945 to oversee the formation of Hungarian SS units. But in the last months of the war, it was very difficult to create a new major military unit, so the "corps" consisted of a number of Hungarian units from the 25th Waffen Grenadier Division of the SS Hunyadi and the 26th Waffen Grenadier Division of the SS, assembled in the town of Burghausen. From Burghausen, the corps went into the interior of Austria. On May 3, the last battle between the Hungarians and the Americans took place. The corps surrendered the next day.

Corps commanders
 SS-Obergruppenführer and General of the SS Ferenc Feketehalmy-Czeydner (March - April 1945)
 SS-Obergruppenführer and SS General Jenö Ruszkay (April - May 1945)

Sources 
 Lexikon-der-wehrmacht
 Axishistory
 Rolf Stoves: Die gepanzerten und motorisierten deutschen Großverbände 1935—1945, Nebel-Verlag, 2003, ISBN 3-89555-102-3

Waffen-SS corps
Military units and formations established in 1945
Military units and formations disestablished in 1945